The following Confederate States Army units and commanders fought in the First Battle of Winchester of the American Civil War. The Union order of battle is listed separately.

Abbreviations used

Military rank
 Gen = General
 LTG = Lieutenant General
 MG = Major General
 BG = Brigadier General
 Col = Colonel
 Ltc = Lieutenant Colonel
 Maj = Major
 Cpt = Captain
 Lt = Lieutenant
 Sgt = Sergeant

Other
 w = wounded
 mw = mortally wounded
 k = killed
 c = captured

Department of the Valley
MG Thomas J. Jackson

Forces at Winchester
MG Thomas J. Jackson

References
 The Opposing Forces at First Winchester

 Cozzens, Peter. Shenandoah 1862: Stonewall Jackson's Valley Campaign. Chapel Hill: University of North Carolina Press, 2008. .

American Civil War orders of battle